The 2016 UCI Oceania Tour was the twelfth season of the UCI Oceania Tour. The season began on 20 January 2016 with the New Zealand Cycle Classic and finished on 5 March 2016 with the Continental Championships.

The points leader, based on the cumulative results of previous races, wears the UCI Oceania Tour cycling jersey. Taylor Gunman from New Zealand is the defending 2015 UCI Oceania Tour champion.

Throughout the season, points are awarded to the top finishers of stages within stage races and the final general classification standings of each of the stages races and one-day events. The quality and complexity of a race also determines how many points are awarded to the top finishers, the higher the UCI rating of a race, the more points are awarded.
The UCI ratings from highest to lowest are as follows:
 Multi-day events: 2.HC, 2.1 and 2.2
 One-day events: 1.HC, 1.1 and 1.2

Events

Final standings

Individual classification

Team classification

Nation classification

External links
 

 
UCI Oceania Tour
2016 in men's road cycling
UCI Oceania Tour